Senator Friend may refer to:

Francis H. Friend (1898–1958), Maine State Senate
Mike Friend (born 1961), Nebraska State Senate